Archives West is an online catalog of descriptive information about the archival collections at various institutions in the western United States (Idaho, Montana, Oregon, Alaska, Utah and Washington).  It was established in 2005, and is a program offering of the Orbis Cascade Alliance. From 2005 to 2015, the site was known as Northwest Digital Archives (NWDA); the name changed as part of a substantial redesign to better describe the site's content and scope.

It was funded by the National Endowment for the Humanities in two phases between 2002 and 2007, and by the National Historical Publications and Records Commission. Since 2007, it has been supported by the contributing institutions.

It uses Encoded Archival Description (EAD).

Contributing institutions

Boise State University
Central Washington University
Central Oregon Community College
Confederated Tribes of the Siletz
Eastern Oregon University
Eastern Washington University
George Fox University
Lane Community College
Lewis & Clark College
Linfield College
Montana Historical Society
Montana State University
Oregon Health & Science University
Oregon Historical Society
Oregon Institute of Technology
Oregon State University
Pacific Lutheran University
Pacific University
Portland State University
Salt Lake County Archives
Seattle Municipal Archives
Seattle Pacific University
Seattle Museum of History & Industry
Seattle University
Tacoma Public Library
The Evergreen State College
University of Alaska Fairbanks
University of Idaho
University of Montana
University of Oregon
University of Puget Sound
University of Utah
University of Washington
Utah State University
Washington State University
Western Oregon University
Western Washington University
Whitman College
Whitworth University
Willamette University

References

External links 
 Archives West (official website)
 Orbis Cascade Alliance (official website)

Internet properties established in 2005
2005 establishments in the United States
Online archives of the United States